Eupithecia is the largest genus of moths of the family Geometridae, and the namesake and type genus of tribe Eupitheciini. Species in the genus are, like those of other genera in the tribe, commonly known as pugs. The genus is highly speciose, with over 1400 species, and members of the genus are present in most of the world with exception of Australasia. Roughly a quarter of described Eupithecia species occur in the Neotropical realm, where they have an especially high species diversity in the montane rain forests of the Andes. The genus includes a few agricultural pest species, such as the currant pug moth, Eupithecia assimilata, which is a pest on hops, and the cloaked pug moth, Eupithecia abietaria, which is a cone pest in spruce seed orchards.

Adult specimens of Eupithecia are typically small, often between 12 and 35 mm, with muted colours, and display a large amount of uniformity between species. As a result, identification of a specimen as part of genus Eupithecia is generally easy, but identifying the exact species is difficult and often reliant on examination of the dissected genitals. Most species share a characteristic resting pose in which the forewings are held flat at a right angle to the body—that is, the costal margins of both forewings form a more-or-less horizontal line—while the hindwings are largely covered by the forewings. They are generally nocturnal. 

Of the species where the larval behaviour is known, most feed from the flowers and seeds of their food plants rather than the foliage. Many species have a very specific food plant. The larvae of all but one of the endemic species of Eupithecia from Hawaii are ambush predators of a wide variety of insects and spiders. These ambush predators have raptorial legs, with which they grab prey that comes into contact with their hind end.

Species
This is a list of all described species.

A

Eupithecia abbreviata
Eupithecia abdera
Eupithecia abietaria
Eupithecia absinthiata
Eupithecia accurata
Eupithecia achyrdaghica
Eupithecia acidalioides
Eupithecia acolpodes
Eupithecia acosmos
Eupithecia acragas
Eupithecia actaeata
Eupithecia actrix
Eupithecia acutangula
Eupithecia acutipapillata
Eupithecia acutipennis
Eupithecia acutula
Eupithecia acyrtoterma
Eupithecia addictata
Eupithecia adelpha
Eupithecia adequata
Eupithecia adjemica
Eupithecia admiranda
Eupithecia adoranda
Eupithecia adspersata
Eupithecia aduncata
Eupithecia aegyptiaca
Eupithecia aella
Eupithecia aenigma
Eupithecia aequabila
Eupithecia affinata
Eupithecia affinitata
Eupithecia agnesata
Eupithecia albertiata
Eupithecia albibaltea
Eupithecia albibasalis
Eupithecia albibisecta
Eupithecia albicapitata
Eupithecia albicarnea
Eupithecia albicentralis
Eupithecia albiceps
Eupithecia albicristulata
Eupithecia albidulata
Eupithecia albifurva
Eupithecia albifusca
Eupithecia albigrisata
Eupithecia albigutta
Eupithecia albimaculata
Eupithecia albimedia
Eupithecia albimixta
Eupithecia albimontanata
Eupithecia albirasa
Eupithecia albirivata
Eupithecia albisecta
Eupithecia albispumata
Eupithecia albistillata
Eupithecia albistrigata
Eupithecia albofasciata
Eupithecia albursi
Eupithecia albuta
Eupithecia alexiae
Eupithecia aliena
Eupithecia alishana
Eupithecia alliaria
Eupithecia alogista
Eupithecia alpinata
Eupithecia alticomora
Eupithecia altitudinis
Eupithecia amandae
Eupithecia amasina
Eupithecia amathes
Eupithecia amicula
Eupithecia ammonata
Eupithecia ammorrhoa
Eupithecia amphiplex
Eupithecia amplexata
Eupithecia amurensis
Eupithecia anactoria
Eupithecia analiscripta
Eupithecia analoga
Eupithecia anamnesa
Eupithecia anasticta
Eupithecia ancillata
Eupithecia andrasi
Eupithecia anemica
Eupithecia anguinata
Eupithecia angulata
Eupithecia angustiarum
Eupithecia anickaeEupithecia anikiniEupithecia anitaEupithecia annulataEupithecia antalicaEupithecia antariaEupithecia anticariaEupithecia anticuraEupithecia antigraphataEupithecia antiquaEupithecia antivulgariaEupithecia aphanesEupithecia apicistrigataEupithecia apparatissimaEupithecia appendiculataEupithecia aptaEupithecia aradjounaEupithecia araucoEupithecia arenariaEupithecia arenbergeriEupithecia arenitinctaEupithecia arenosaEupithecia arenosissimaEupithecia argenteaEupithecia aritaiEupithecia armeniacaEupithecia asemaEupithecia asempiternaEupithecia asperataEupithecia assectataEupithecia assimilataEupithecia assimilisEupithecia assulataEupithecia astalesEupithecia asteriaEupithecia astrictaEupithecia atacamaEupithecia atacamaensisEupithecia atomariaEupithecia atricollarisEupithecia atrisignisEupithecia atromaculataEupithecia attaliEupithecia atuniEupithecia avaraEupithecia aysenaeBEupithecia balintzsoltiEupithecia balteataEupithecia bandurriasaeEupithecia bardiariaEupithecia barteliEupithecia bastelbergeriEupithecia basurmancaEupithecia batangiEupithecia batidaEupithecia behrensataEupithecia bellaEupithecia bellimargoEupithecia bestiaEupithecia bialbataEupithecia bicubitataEupithecia bicurviceraEupithecia biedermanataEupithecia bifasciataEupithecia biornataEupithecia biumbrataEupithecia biviridataEupithecia bivittataEupithecia blandulaEupithecia blennaEupithecia bohatschiEupithecia bolesporaEupithecia bolteriiEupithecia bonetaEupithecia borealisEupithecia boryataEupithecia bowmaniEupithecia brachypteraEupithecia brandtiEupithecia breviculaEupithecia breviculataEupithecia brevifasciariaEupithecia briseisEupithecia broteasEupithecia brouiEupithecia brunneataEupithecia brunneiluteaEupithecia brunneodorsataEupithecia brunneomarginataEupithecia bryantiEupithecia bullataEupithecia burmataEupithecia burselongataEupithecia butvilaiEupithecia buysseataCEupithecia cabrasaeEupithecia cabreriaEupithecia caburguaEupithecia cachinaEupithecia caducaEupithecia caementariataEupithecia calderaeEupithecia calientesEupithecia caligineaEupithecia caliginosaEupithecia calligraphataEupithecia camillaEupithecia canaEupithecia canchasaeEupithecia candicansEupithecia candidataEupithecia canisparsaEupithecia canonicaEupithecia capitataEupithecia carneataEupithecia carpophagataEupithecia carpophilataEupithecia carribeanaEupithecia casloataEupithecia casmenaEupithecia castaEupithecia castellataEupithecia catalinataEupithecia cauchiataEupithecia cautinEupithecia cazieriEupithecia celatisignaEupithecia centaureataEupithecia cercinaEupithecia cerussariaEupithecia cervinaEupithecia ceryneaEupithecia cestataEupithecia cestatoidesEupithecia chalikophilaEupithecia chapoEupithecia cheitunaEupithecia chesiataEupithecia chilensisEupithecia chimeraEupithecia chinchaEupithecia chinganaEupithecia chiricahuataEupithecia chlorofasciataEupithecia chlorophoraEupithecia christophiEupithecia chrodnaEupithecia chuiEupithecia cichisaEupithecia cimicifugataEupithecia cingulataEupithecia cinnamomataEupithecia citrariaEupithecia classicataEupithecia claudeiEupithecia claviferaEupithecia coaequalisEupithecia cocciferataEupithecia coccineaEupithecia cocoataEupithecia coetulataEupithecia cognizataEupithecia cohabitansEupithecia cohorticulaEupithecia collineataEupithecia coloradensisEupithecia columbiataEupithecia comesEupithecia concavaEupithecia concepcionEupithecia concinnaEupithecia concremataEupithecia concostivexaEupithecia conduplicataEupithecia coniurataEupithecia conjunctivaEupithecia connexaEupithecia consorsEupithecia consortariaEupithecia conterminataEupithecia contextaEupithecia contrariaEupithecia convallataEupithecia convexaEupithecia convivaEupithecia cooptataEupithecia copaquillaensisEupithecia coquimboEupithecia cordataEupithecia coribalteataEupithecia corralensisEupithecia correanaEupithecia corroborataEupithecia corticataEupithecia costalisEupithecia costiconvexaEupithecia costimaculariaEupithecia costipictaEupithecia costirufariaEupithecia costivallataEupithecia cotidianaEupithecia crateriasEupithecia crenataEupithecia cretaceataEupithecia cretataEupithecia cretosaEupithecia cuculliariaEupithecia cugiaiEupithecia cuneataEupithecia cuneilineataEupithecia cuninaEupithecia cupreariaEupithecia cupreataEupithecia cupressataEupithecia curacautinaeEupithecia curvifasciaDEupithecia daemionataEupithecia dalhousiensisEupithecia damnosaEupithecia dargeiEupithecia dayensisEupithecia dealbataEupithecia dearmataEupithecia dechkanataEupithecia decipiensEupithecia decorataEupithecia decrepitaEupithecia decussataEupithecia defimbriataEupithecia deformisEupithecia delicataEupithecia delozonaEupithecia demetataEupithecia demissaEupithecia denotataEupithecia densicaudaEupithecia denticulataEupithecia dentosaEupithecia depastaEupithecia derogataEupithecia descimoniEupithecia despectariaEupithecia detritataEupithecia deverrataEupithecia devestitaEupithecia deviaEupithecia dichromaEupithecia dierliEupithecia dilucidaEupithecia dimidiaEupithecia dinshoensisEupithecia discipunctaEupithecia discolorEupithecia discordansEupithecia discretataEupithecia disformataEupithecia dissertataEupithecia dissobaptaEupithecia dissonansEupithecia dissorsEupithecia distinctariaEupithecia divertentaEupithecia djakonoviEupithecia dodoneataEupithecia dohertyiEupithecia doliaEupithecia dolosaEupithecia dominariaEupithecia dormitaEupithecia drasticaEupithecia druentiataEupithecia dryinombraEupithecia dubiosaEupithecia duenaEupithecia duplexEupithecia duraEupithecia dusticaEupithecia dzhirgatalensisEEupithecia ebriosaEupithecia ecplytaEupithecia edaphopteryxEupithecia ednaEupithecia eduardiEupithecia edwardsiEupithecia efferataEupithecia egenaEupithecia egenariaEupithecia egregiataEupithecia elbursiEupithecia elbursiataEupithecia elbutaEupithecia electreofasciataEupithecia elimataEupithecia elissaEupithecia elquiensisEupithecia emanataEupithecia emendataEupithecia emittensEupithecia emporiasEupithecia encoensisEupithecia endonepheliaEupithecia endothermaEupithecia ensiferaEupithecia erecticomaEupithecia erectinotaEupithecia eremiataEupithecia ericeataEupithecia ericetiEupithecia eszterkaeEupithecia eupompaEupithecia euryteraEupithecia evacuataEupithecia evansiEupithecia exacerbataEupithecia exactataEupithecia exheresEupithecia exicterataEupithecia exiguataEupithecia eximiaEupithecia exophychraEupithecia expallidataEupithecia exquisitaEupithecia exrubicundaEupithecia extensariaEupithecia extinctataEupithecia extraversariaEupithecia extremataEupithecia extrinsecaEupithecia exudataFEupithecia falkenbergiEupithecia falkneriEupithecia famulariaEupithecia fastuosaEupithecia fatigataEupithecia faustaEupithecia feliscaudataEupithecia fenitaEupithecia fennoscandicaEupithecia fericlavaEupithecia fernandiEupithecia fervidaEupithecia fessaEupithecia fibigeriEupithecia filiaEupithecia finitimaEupithecia fioriataEupithecia firmataEupithecia flaviguttaEupithecia flavimaculaEupithecia flavoapicariaEupithecia fletcherataEupithecia fletcheriEupithecia flexicornutaEupithecia florianiiEupithecia formosaEupithecia forsterataEupithecia fortisEupithecia fossariaEupithecia fosteriEupithecia frederickiEupithecia frediEupithecia frequensEupithecia frontosaEupithecia fulgurataEupithecia fuliginataEupithecia fulvidorsataEupithecia fulvipennisEupithecia fulviplagiataEupithecia fulvistrigaEupithecia fumifasciaEupithecia fumimixtaEupithecia funereaEupithecia furcataEupithecia furvipennisEupithecia fuscaEupithecia fuscataEupithecia fuscicostataEupithecia fuscopunctataEupithecia fuscorufaGEupithecia galapagosataEupithecia galepsaEupithecia galsworthyiEupithecia garrulaEupithecia garudaEupithecia gaumariaEupithecia gelbrechtiEupithecia gelidataEupithecia gemellataEupithecia giganteaEupithecia gilataEupithecia gilvipennataEupithecia glaisiEupithecia glaucotinctaEupithecia gluptataEupithecia gomerensisEupithecia goslinaEupithecia graciliataEupithecia gradatilineaEupithecia graefiEupithecia granataEupithecia graphataEupithecia graphiticataEupithecia grappleriEupithecia gratiosataEupithecia griveaudiEupithecia groenblomiEupithecia guamanicaEupithecia guayacanaeEupithecia gueneataEupithecia gypsophilataHEupithecia habermaniEupithecia hainanensisEupithecia halosydneEupithecia hamletiEupithecia hannemanniEupithecia harenosaEupithecia harrisonataEupithecia hashimotoiEupithecia hastariaEupithecia haworthiataEupithecia haywardiEupithecia hebesEupithecia helenaEupithecia helenariaEupithecia hemileucaEupithecia hemileucariaEupithecia hemiochraEupithecia herczigiEupithecia herefordariaEupithecia hesperinaEupithecia higaEupithecia hilachaEupithecia hilariataEupithecia hilarisEupithecia himalayataEupithecia hippolyteEupithecia hodebertiEupithecia hoenehermanniEupithecia hoeneiEupithecia hohokamaeEupithecia hollowayiEupithecia holtiEupithecia hombrillaEupithecia homogrammataEupithecia honestaEupithecia hongxiangaeEupithecia horismoidesEupithecia hormigaEupithecia horridaEupithecia hreblayiEupithecia huachucaEupithecia hundamoiEupithecia husseiniEupithecia hydrargyreaEupithecia hypophasmaEupithecia hystericaIEupithecia icterataEupithecia idaeoidesEupithecia idaliaEupithecia illaborataEupithecia illepidusEupithecia immensaEupithecia immodicaEupithecia immundataEupithecia impavidaEupithecia implorataEupithecia impolitaEupithecia importunaEupithecia improbaEupithecia improvisaEupithecia impurataEupithecia inaEupithecia inassignataEupithecia incohataEupithecia incommodaEupithecia inconclusariaEupithecia inconspicuataEupithecia incorruptaEupithecia incurvariaEupithecia indecisaEupithecia indecoraEupithecia indefinataEupithecia indigataEupithecia indissolubilisEupithecia indistinctaEupithecia ineptaEupithecia inexercitaEupithecia inexhaustaEupithecia inexpiataEupithecia inexplicabilisEupithecia infaustaEupithecia infectaEupithecia infectariaEupithecia infecundaEupithecia infelixEupithecia infensaEupithecia infestataEupithecia infimbriataEupithecia infortunataEupithecia innotataEupithecia inopinataEupithecia inoueataEupithecia inquinataEupithecia insanaEupithecia inscitataEupithecia insigniataEupithecia insignificaEupithecia insolabilisEupithecia insolitaEupithecia interpunctariaEupithecia interrubescensEupithecia interrubrescensEupithecia intolerabilisEupithecia intricataEupithecia inturbataEupithecia inveterataEupithecia invictaEupithecia iphionaEupithecia irambataEupithecia irenicaEupithecia irrepertaEupithecia irriguataEupithecia isabellinaEupithecia isopsaliodesEupithecia isopsaloidesEupithecia isotenesEupithecia iterataJ-KEupithecia jacksoniEupithecia jamesiEupithecia jeanneliEupithecia jefrenataEupithecia jejunataEupithecia jermyiEupithecia jezonicaEupithecia jinboiEupithecia jizlensisEupithecia joanataEupithecia johnstoniEupithecia jorgeEupithecia josefinaEupithecia juliaEupithecia juncalensisEupithecia junctifasciaEupithecia juntasaeEupithecia kamaEupithecia kamburongaEupithecia karadaghensisEupithecia karakasykensisEupithecia karapinensisEupithecia karenaeEupithecia karischiEupithecia karliEupithecia karnaliensisEupithecia keredjanaEupithecia khamaEupithecia kibatiataEupithecia kingaEupithecia kobayashiiEupithecia kondaranaEupithecia konradiEupithecia kopetdaghicaEupithecia kostjukiEupithecia kozhantschikoviEupithecia kozloviEupithecia krampliEupithecia kruusiEupithecia kudoiEupithecia kuldschaensisEupithecia kuniEupithecia kurilensisEupithecia kuroshioEupithecia kurtiaLEupithecia lachaumeiEupithecia lachrymosaEupithecia lacteolataEupithecia lactevirensEupithecia lactibasisEupithecia lafontaineataEupithecia lamataEupithecia lanceataEupithecia landryiEupithecia laoicaEupithecia laquaeariaEupithecia larentimimaEupithecia lariciataEupithecia lascivaEupithecia laszloiEupithecia lataEupithecia laterataEupithecia laticallisEupithecia latifurcataEupithecia latimediaEupithecia latipennataEupithecia latitansEupithecia laudabilisEupithecia laudendaEupithecia leamariaeEupithecia lecerfiataEupithecia lechriotornaEupithecia leleupiEupithecia lentiscataEupithecia leptogrammataEupithecia leucenthesisEupithecia leucographataEupithecia leucoproraEupithecia leucospilaEupithecia leucostaxisEupithecia levataEupithecia liberataEupithecia licitaEupithecia liguriataEupithecia likiangiEupithecia lilliputataEupithecia limbataEupithecia linariataEupithecia lindaEupithecia lindtiEupithecia lineisdistinctaEupithecia lineosaEupithecia liniEupithecia liqalanengEupithecia lissopisEupithecia lithographataEupithecia litorisEupithecia lobbichlerataEupithecia longibasalisEupithecia longidensEupithecia longifimbriaEupithecia longipalpataEupithecia longipennataEupithecia lucigeraEupithecia luctuosaEupithecia ludificataEupithecia lugubrisEupithecia lunataEupithecia lunaticaEupithecia lupaEupithecia lusoriaEupithecia luteonigraEupithecia lvovskyiMEupithecia macdunnoughiEupithecia macfarlandiEupithecia macreusEupithecia macrocarpataEupithecia macrodiscaEupithecia maculosaEupithecia maduraEupithecia maenamiellaEupithecia maerkerataEupithecia maestosaEupithecia magicaEupithecia magnifactaEupithecia magnipunctaEupithecia mahomedanaEupithecia malchoensisEupithecia maleformataEupithecia mallecoensisEupithecia malotiEupithecia mandschuricaEupithecia manifestaEupithecia marasaEupithecia marginataEupithecia marmaricataEupithecia marmoreaEupithecia marnotiEupithecia marpessaEupithecia masculinaEupithecia maspalomaeEupithecia massiliataEupithecia matheriEupithecia matronaEupithecia maturaEupithecia mauleEupithecia mauvariaEupithecia meandrataEupithecia mecodaedalaEupithecia mediargentataEupithecia mediataEupithecia medilunataEupithecia mediobrunneaEupithecia mediocinctaEupithecia megaprotervaEupithecia mejalaEupithecia mekranaEupithecia melanograptaEupithecia memorataEupithecia mendosariaEupithecia mentavoniEupithecia mentitaEupithecia meridianaEupithecia mesodeictaEupithecia mesogrammataEupithecia microleucaEupithecia microptilotaEupithecia millefoliataEupithecia millesimaEupithecia mimaEupithecia minimariaEupithecia minuciaEupithecia minusculataEupithecia minutulaEupithecia miraEupithecia mireiEupithecia mirificataEupithecia miserulataEupithecia missionerataEupithecia misturataEupithecia mitigataEupithecia moechaEupithecia molestissimaEupithecia molliariaEupithecia mollitaEupithecia molybdaenaEupithecia monacheataEupithecia montanaEupithecia montanataEupithecia montavoniEupithecia monticolaEupithecia monticolansEupithecia moricandiataEupithecia morosaEupithecia mortuaEupithecia multiplexEupithecia multiscriptaEupithecia multispinataEupithecia multistrigataEupithecia mundiscriptaEupithecia munguataEupithecia murallaEupithecia muscistrigataEupithecia musculaEupithecia mustangataEupithecia mutataEupithecia myomaEupithecia mystiataEupithecia mysticaNEupithecia nabagulensisEupithecia nabokoviEupithecia nachadiraEupithecia nadiaeEupithecia nagaiiEupithecia nahuelbutaEupithecia nanataEupithecia natalicaEupithecia naumanniEupithecia necessariaEupithecia nemoralisEupithecia nemruticaEupithecia neomexicanaEupithecia neosatyrataEupithecia nepalataEupithecia nephelataEupithecia nervosaEupithecia nesciariaEupithecia nevadataEupithecia nigrataeniaEupithecia nigribasisEupithecia nigrilineaEupithecia nigrinotataEupithecia nigripennisEupithecia nigristriataEupithecia nigritariaEupithecia nigrithoraxEupithecia nigrodiscataEupithecia nigropolataEupithecia nimbicolorEupithecia nimbosaEupithecia niphadophilataEupithecia niphonariaEupithecia niphoreasEupithecia nirvanaEupithecia nishizawaiEupithecia niticallisEupithecia niveataEupithecia niveifasciaEupithecia niveivenaEupithecia nobilitataEupithecia nodosaEupithecia nonanticariaEupithecia noncoactaEupithecia nonferendaEupithecia nonpurgataEupithecia norquincoEupithecia novataEupithecia noxiaEupithecia nubilariaEupithecia nublaeEupithecia nuceistrigataEupithecia nusretOEupithecia obliquiplagaEupithecia oblongipennisEupithecia obscurataEupithecia obtinensEupithecia ochraceaEupithecia ochralbaEupithecia ochrataEupithecia ochridataEupithecia ochroriguataEupithecia ochrosomaEupithecia ochrovittataEupithecia oculataEupithecia oenoneEupithecia ogilviataEupithecia okadaiEupithecia olgaeEupithecia olivaceaEupithecia olivariaEupithecia olivocostataEupithecia omissaEupithecia omnigeraEupithecia omniparensEupithecia opicataEupithecia opistographataEupithecia oppidanaEupithecia oranaEupithecia orbaEupithecia orbariaEupithecia orichlorisEupithecia ornataEupithecia orneaEupithecia orobaEupithecia orphnataEupithecia orsetillaEupithecia osornoensisEupithecia otiosaEupithecia ovalleEupithecia owenataEupithecia oxycedrataPEupithecia pactiaEupithecia pallidicostaEupithecia pallidistrigaEupithecia palmataEupithecia palpataEupithecia pamiricaEupithecia panaceaEupithecia pandaEupithecia pannosaEupithecia pantellataEupithecia parallaxisEupithecia parallelariaEupithecia parcirufaEupithecia particepsEupithecia paryphataEupithecia paulianiEupithecia pauperaEupithecia pauxillariaEupithecia peckorumEupithecia pedibaEupithecia peguensisEupithecia pekingianaEupithecia pellicataEupithecia penablancaEupithecia penicillaEupithecia perciliataEupithecia perculsariaEupithecia percuriosaEupithecia peregovitsiEupithecia peregrinaEupithecia perendinaEupithecia perficaEupithecia perfuscaEupithecia perigraphataEupithecia perigraptaEupithecia pernotataEupithecia perolivataEupithecia perpetuaEupithecia perryvriesiEupithecia persidisEupithecia persimulataEupithecia personataEupithecia persuastrixEupithecia pertactaEupithecia pertusataEupithecia petersiEupithecia petrohueEupithecia pettyiEupithecia pettyioidesEupithecia pfeifferataEupithecia phaeaEupithecia phaeocaustaEupithecia phaiosataEupithecia phantasticaEupithecia philippisEupithecia phoebeEupithecia phoeniceataEupithecia phulchokianaEupithecia phyllisaeEupithecia physocleoraEupithecia picadaEupithecia piccataEupithecia pictimargoEupithecia picturataEupithecia pieriaEupithecia pilosaEupithecia pimpinellataEupithecia pinataEupithecia pindosataEupithecia pinkeriEupithecia pippaEupithecia pippoidesEupithecia placensEupithecia placidaEupithecia placidataEupithecia planipennisEupithecia planiscriptaEupithecia platymesaEupithecia plumasataEupithecia plumbeolataEupithecia pluripunctariaEupithecia poecilataEupithecia pollensEupithecia polylibadesEupithecia ponderataEupithecia praealtaEupithecia praecipitataEupithecia praepupillataEupithecia praesignataEupithecia prasinombraEupithecia pretansataEupithecia pretorianaEupithecia primitivaEupithecia problematicataEupithecia procerissimaEupithecia prochazkaiEupithecia profluaEupithecia profugaEupithecia proinsigniataEupithecia propagataEupithecia proprivataEupithecia prostrataEupithecia protervaEupithecia proutiEupithecia pseudassimilataEupithecia pseudexheresEupithecia pseudoabbreviataEupithecia pseudoicterataEupithecia pseudosatyrataEupithecia pseudotsugataEupithecia psiadiataEupithecia ptychospilaEupithecia pucatrihueEupithecia puconEupithecia puellaEupithecia puengeleriEupithecia pulchellataEupithecia pulgataEupithecia pupilaEupithecia purpureoviridisEupithecia purpurissataEupithecia pusillataEupithecia pygmaeataEupithecia pyreneataEupithecia pyricoetesQ-REupithecia qinlingataEupithecia quadripunctataEupithecia quakerataEupithecia querceticaEupithecia rajataEupithecia raniataEupithecia ratoncillaEupithecia raucaEupithecia ravocostaliataEupithecia rebeliEupithecia recensEupithecia recintoensisEupithecia rectilineaEupithecia redingtoniaEupithecia redivivaEupithecia refertissimaEupithecia reginaEupithecia reginamontiumEupithecia regulellaEupithecia regulosaEupithecia reisserataEupithecia relativaEupithecia relaxataEupithecia relictataEupithecia remissataEupithecia remmiEupithecia repentinaEupithecia repetitaEupithecia resartaEupithecia retusaEupithecia rhadineEupithecia rhodopyraEupithecia rhoisataEupithecia rhombipennisEupithecia ridiculataEupithecia rigoutiEupithecia rindgeiEupithecia ripariaEupithecia robiginascensEupithecia robinsoniEupithecia ronkayiEupithecia rosaiEupithecia rosaliaEupithecia rosmarinataEupithecia rotundopunctaEupithecia rougeotiEupithecia rubellataEupithecia rubellicinctaEupithecia rubeniEupithecia rubigataEupithecia rubiginiferaEupithecia rubridorsataEupithecia rubristigmaEupithecia rufaEupithecia rufescensEupithecia ruficorpusEupithecia rufipalpataEupithecia rufivenataEupithecia rulenaEupithecia rusicadariaEupithecia russeliataEupithecia russeolaEupithecia russulaEupithecia ryukyuensisSEupithecia sabulosataEupithecia sachaliniEupithecia sacrimontisEupithecia sacrivicaeEupithecia sacrosanctaEupithecia sagittataEupithecia saisanariaEupithecia saldaitisiEupithecia saltiEupithecia salubrisEupithecia santolinataEupithecia saphenesEupithecia sardoaEupithecia satyrataEupithecia scabrogataEupithecia scalptataEupithecia scaphiataEupithecia schiefereriEupithecia schnitzleriEupithecia schuetzeataEupithecia schwingenschussiEupithecia scioneEupithecia sclerataEupithecia scopariataEupithecia scoriodesEupithecia scortillataEupithecia scotodesEupithecia scribaiEupithecia seatacamaEupithecia sectilaEupithecia sectilineaEupithecia seditiosaEupithecia segregataEupithecia selinataEupithecia selliaEupithecia sellimimaEupithecia selvaEupithecia semicalvaEupithecia semiflavataEupithecia semigraphataEupithecia semilignataEupithecia semilotariaEupithecia semilugensEupithecia seminigraEupithecia semipallidaEupithecia semirufescensEupithecia semivacuaEupithecia sempiternaEupithecia senoritaEupithecia separataEupithecia serenataEupithecia serpentigenaEupithecia severaEupithecia sewardataEupithecia sexpunctataEupithecia shachdarensisEupithecia sharronataEupithecia sheppardataEupithecia shikokuensisEupithecia shirleyataEupithecia siataEupithecia sibyllaEupithecia sierraeEupithecia signigeraEupithecia silenataEupithecia silenicolataEupithecia simpliciataEupithecia sinceraEupithecia singhalensisEupithecia sinicariaEupithecia sinuataEupithecia sinuosariaEupithecia skouiEupithecia slossonataEupithecia sobriaEupithecia sodalisEupithecia sogaiEupithecia solaEupithecia solianikoviEupithecia somereniEupithecia sonoraEupithecia sophiaEupithecia sordaEupithecia soricellaEupithecia spadiceataEupithecia specialisEupithecia spermaphagaEupithecia sperryiEupithecia spilocymaEupithecia spilosataEupithecia spinibarbataEupithecia spissataEupithecia spissilineataEupithecia sporobolaEupithecia spurcataEupithecia stagiraEupithecia statariaEupithecia staurophragmaEupithecia steeleaeEupithecia stellataEupithecia stertziEupithecia sticticataEupithecia stigmaticataEupithecia stigmatophoraEupithecia stomachosaEupithecia strattonataEupithecia streptozonaEupithecia strigatissimaEupithecia studiosaEupithecia stueningiEupithecia stypheliaeEupithecia subalbaEupithecia subanisEupithecia subapicataEupithecia subbreviataEupithecia subbrunneataEupithecia subcaniparsEupithecia subcolorataEupithecia subconclusariaEupithecia subdeverrataEupithecia subexiguataEupithecia subextremataEupithecia subfenestrataEupithecia subflavolineataEupithecia subfumosaEupithecia subfuscataEupithecia subindutaEupithecia sublataEupithecia submirandaEupithecia subnixaEupithecia suboxydataEupithecia subplacidaEupithecia subpulchrataEupithecia subregulosaEupithecia subrubescensEupithecia subscriptariaEupithecia subsequariaEupithecia subtacinctaEupithecia subtilisEupithecia subumbrataEupithecia subvaticinaEupithecia subvirensEupithecia subvulgataEupithecia succenturiataEupithecia succernataEupithecia sucidataEupithecia summissaEupithecia superataEupithecia supercastigataEupithecia supersophiaEupithecia supportaEupithecia suspiciosataEupithecia sutiliataEupithecia svetlanaeEupithecia swanniEupithecia swettiiEupithecia sylphariaEupithecia syriacataEupithecia szaboiEupithecia szelenyicaTEupithecia tabacataEupithecia tabestanaEupithecia taiwanaEupithecia takaoEupithecia tamaraEupithecia tamarugalisEupithecia tantillariaEupithecia tantilloidesEupithecia tarapacaEupithecia tarensisEupithecia tarfataEupithecia tectariaEupithecia tempestuosaEupithecia tenellataEupithecia teneraEupithecia tenerifensisEupithecia tenoensisEupithecia tenuataEupithecia tenuiataEupithecia tenuiscriptaEupithecia tenuisquamaEupithecia tepidaEupithecia terrenataEupithecia terrestrataEupithecia tesserataEupithecia testaceaEupithecia tetraglenaEupithecia thaicaEupithecia thalictrataEupithecia theobrominaEupithecia thermosariaEupithecia thessaEupithecia thiaucourtiEupithecia thomasiEupithecia thomasinaEupithecia tibetanaEupithecia tornolophaEupithecia toulgoetiEupithecia trampaEupithecia trancasaeEupithecia tranquillaEupithecia transactaEupithecia transalaiensisEupithecia transexpiataEupithecia tremulaEupithecia trianguliferaEupithecia tribunariaEupithecia tricerataEupithecia tricolorataEupithecia tricrossaEupithecia tricuspisEupithecia trigenuataEupithecia tripolitaniataEupithecia tripunctariaEupithecia trisignariaEupithecia tritaEupithecia tritariaEupithecia tropicataEupithecia truncatipennisEupithecia truschiEupithecia tshimganicaEupithecia tshimkentensisEupithecia turbantaEupithecia turkmenaEupithecia turliniEupithecia turpiculaEupithecia turpisEupithecia tutsianaU-VEupithecia uighuricaEupithecia uintaEupithecia ultimariaEupithecia ultrixEupithecia undataEupithecia undiculataEupithecia undulatariaEupithecia unduliferaEupithecia unedonataEupithecia unicolorEupithecia unitariaEupithecia urbanataEupithecia ursinaEupithecia usbecaEupithecia ustaEupithecia ustataEupithecia utaeEupithecia uvariaEupithecia vacuataEupithecia valdiviaEupithecia valeriaEupithecia valerianataEupithecia vallenarensisEupithecia vanaEupithecia variostrigataEupithecia vastaEupithecia vaticinaEupithecia veletaEupithecia velutipennisEupithecia venedictoffaeEupithecia venosataEupithecia venulataEupithecia veratrariaEupithecia verecundaEupithecia vermiculataEupithecia verprotaEupithecia versiplagaEupithecia vesiculataEupithecia vetulaEupithecia viataEupithecia vicinaEupithecia vicksburgiEupithecia viduataEupithecia vilisEupithecia villicaEupithecia vinaceataEupithecia vinibuaEupithecia violaceaEupithecia violettaEupithecia vipereaEupithecia virescensEupithecia virgaureataEupithecia vitiosataEupithecia vitreotataEupithecia vividaEupithecia vojnitsiEupithecia vorariaEupithecia vulgataW-ZEupithecia wangiEupithecia wardiEupithecia weigtiEupithecia weissiEupithecia westonariaEupithecia wilemaniEupithecia wittmeriEupithecia woodgatataEupithecia xanthomixtaEupithecia xylopsisEupithecia yakushimensisEupithecia yanganaEupithecia yasudaiEupithecia yathomiEupithecia yazakiiEupithecia yelchoensisEupithecia yoshimotoiEupithecia yubitzaeEupithecia yunnaniEupithecia zagrosataEupithecia zelmiraEupithecia zibellinataEupithecia zingiberiataEupithecia zombensisEupithecia zygadeniataSpecies of unknown statusEupithecia lavicaria Fuchs, 1902 (syn: Eupithecia lavicata Prout, 1914), described from Norway.Eupithecia minutana TreitschkeEupithecia robusta Dietze, 1910

References

Other sources
 Chinery, Michael (1986). Collins Guide to the Insects of Britain and Western Europe (Reprinted 1991).
 Skinner, Bernard (1984). Colour Identification Guide to Moths of the British Isles''.

External links

Eupithecia Watson, L., and Dallwitz, M.J. 2003 onwards. British insects: the genera of Lepidoptera-Geometridae. Version: 29 December 2011 Description of genus.
Eupithecia images at Encyclopaedia of Life

 
Geometridae genera
Taxa named by John Curtis